North American Collegiate Bridge Championships  are an intramural college competition run by the American Contract Bridge League. The finals are held every summer in conjunction with the North American Bridge Championships. Any college in the United States, Canada, Mexico and/or Bermuda is eligible to participate in the event. Teams must consist of four to six players all from the same college.

Competition 

The first North American College Team Championship was held in 1987 at the Spring NABC in St. Louis and the winners (except Barry Goren, who was not eligible because of his age) represented ACBL in the first World Junior Championships in the Netherlands. Guy Doherty, Jon Heller and Asya Kamsky—joined by Bill Hsieh and Aaron Silverstein—finished third in the World Junior championships.

The championships were played at the Spring NABCs from 1988 to 1990. In 1990, after Harvard had won by what is still the largest margin in the history of the event, the competition was moved to ACBL headquarters in Memphis where it was co-sponsored by ACBL and the Association of College Unions-International. The competition moved back to the Spring NABC in 1991 but the following year, it returned to Memphis, where it became part of the annual Memphis in May activities.

The event was cancelled after the 1996 championships. Between 1997 and 2001, OKBridge and ACBL teamed up to sponsor the Internet College Team Championships. In 2000, the Collegiate Championships were reinstated and held at the Summer NABC in Toronto in 2001. It was cancelled in 2002 and reinstated in 2003.

The competition changed in 2006, with two parts of competition. Teams would play in a one-day online qualifier in January. The format was a bracketed round robin, with the top number of teams from each bracket, up to 8 total, qualifying to the finals. Players received lodging, airfare and spending money to attend. The finals were a two-day competition that took place at the summer North American Bridge Championship. The first day consisted of a complete round robin, with the top four teams qualifying to the second day. The second day was a semi-final and final bracketed knockout. The winning team received a $2,000 scholarship.

In 2014, the competition format changed. Rather than a one-day online qualifier in January, colleges were assigned two head-to-head online matches each month starting in October and concluding in March. Teams would accumulate victory points based on the results of each head-to-head match. The two teams with the highest victory points at the end of December earned the first two qualifying positions. The two teams with the highest victory points at the end of March earned the next two qualifying positions. Four teams total qualified for the two-day championship. Players received lodging, airfare and spending money to attend. The first day was a full-day semi-final round, with the second day being a full-day final round. The winning team received a $20,000 scholarship.

In 2018, the championship was opened to all teams with no qualification required, with the online spring tournaments awarding only travel packages to the top finishers. In 2020, the championship was cancelled along with the Summer NABC due to COVID-19, though an unofficial online championship was held. In 2021, an official tournament was held on Bridge Base Online as part of the Summer NAOBC.

Championship winners

Participating colleges

External links
 ACBL official website

References

Contract bridge competitions
Recurring sporting events established in 2006